Aldaba may refer to:

Hypomolis aldaba, a moth of the family Erebidae
Estefania Aldaba-Lim (1917–2006), psychologist and secretary of the Phillipine Department of Social Services and Development
Herminio Aldaba Astorga (1929–2004), Filipino politician